Oscar Muller (28 July 1957 – 19 August 2005) was an Argentine footballer who played in France with Nantes, Rennes, Amiens and AS Angoulême. His father was Ramon Muller.

He played and scored for Nantes in the 1979 Coupe de France Final.

References

1957 births
2005 deaths
Footballers from Rosario, Santa Fe
Argentine footballers
FC Nantes players
Stade Rennais F.C. players
Amiens SC players
Angoulême Charente FC players
Ligue 1 players
Ligue 2 players
Expatriate footballers in France
Argentine expatriate sportspeople in France
Argentine people of German descent
Argentine expatriate footballers
Association football midfielders